Lauri Arvo Tanner (20 November 1890 – 11 July 1950) was a Finnish gymnast and amateur football (soccer) player who competed in the 1912 Summer Olympics.

He was part of the Finnish team, which won the silver medal in the gymnastics men's team, free system event. He also competed in the football tournament. His only game was the bronze medal game, which Finland lost against the Netherlands 0–9.

References

External links

1890 births
1950 deaths
Finnish male artistic gymnasts
Finnish footballers
Gymnasts at the 1912 Summer Olympics
Footballers at the 1912 Summer Olympics
Olympic gymnasts of Finland
Olympic footballers of Finland
Olympic silver medalists for Finland
Finland international footballers
Olympic medalists in gymnastics
Medalists at the 1912 Summer Olympics
Association football forwards
20th-century Finnish people